Cuverville-sur-Yères (literally Cuverville on Yères) is a commune in the Seine-Maritime department in the Normandy region in northern France.

Geography

Population

Places of interest
 The church of Notre-Dame, dating from the eighteenth century.
 Ruins of a castle.
 A restored watermill.

See also
Communes of the Seine-Maritime department

References

Communes of Seine-Maritime